Peter Rice (1935–1992) was an Irish structural engineer.

Peter Rice may also refer to;

 Peter Rice (executive) (born 1967), British film executive
 Peter Rice (footballer) (born 1938), Australian rules footballer